National Highway 59 (NH 59) is a National Highway in India that connects at last end Jaganathpur in Odisha.

Route

Odisha

 Nuapada
 Khariar
 Titlagarh
 Madanpur Rampur
 Baliguda
 Daringbadi
 Surada
 Dharakote
 Asika
 Hinjilicut
 Brahmapur
 Gopalpur

See also
 List of National Highways in India (by Highway Number)
 National Highways Development Project

References

External links
  Driving Directions NH 59-source-mapsofindia.com

National highways in India (old numbering)